2015–16 Hong Kong Sapling Cup (officially the 2015–16 Henderson Sapling Cup for sponsorship reasons)  is the 1st edition of the Sapling Cup. The Cup is contested by the 9 teams in the 2015–16 Hong Kong Premier League.

The objective of the Cup is to create more potential playing opportunities for youth players. In this Cup competition, each team must play a minimum of two players born on or after 1 January 1994 (U22) and six foreign players at most during every whole match, or send at most four foreign players during every whole match.

Pegasus won the title on 18 May 2016.

Calendar

Results

Group stage

Group A

Group B

Semi-finals

Final

External links
 Hong Kong Sapling Cup - Hong Kong Football Association

References

2015–16 domestic association football cups
Lea
Hong Kong Sapling Cup